The Intersport Heilbronn Open is a defunct professional tennis tournament played on indoor hard courts. It has been part of the ATP Challenger Tour until 2014. It was held annually in Talheim, Germany, since 1984.

Past finals

Singles

Doubles

External links
ITF Search 

 
Intersport Heilbronn Open
Intersport Heilbronn Open
Intersport Heilbronn Open
Intersport Heilbronn Open
1984 establishments in West Germany
Recurring sporting events established in 1984